Phaeobacter gallaeciensis belongs to the roseobacter clade of α-Proteobacteria

References

Further reading

External links
Type strain of Phaeobacter gallaeciensis at BacDive -  the Bacterial Diversity Metadatabase

Rhodobacteraceae
Bacteria described in 1998